The wind lens is a modification on the wind turbine created by Professor Ohya from the Kyushu University as an attempt to be more efficient in production of electricity and less invasive to both humans and nature. While still in progress, the wind lens has a few changes in design which have led to impacts on how wind energy can be used and harnessed while changing how it impacts the world around us. A wind lens works like a ducted fan on an aircraft - it encircles the wind turbine, and speeds air up while protecting the blades from foreign object damage. Because of this, wind turbine efficiency can be drastically increased because of a simple installation of a wind lens.

Design 
As the normal wind turbine does, the wind lens harnesses the energy of the wind but has a few modifications in order to increase efficiency as well as the impact on the environment.

Efficiency of power production 
Studies have shown that the Wind Lens can have between two and five times more output of power compared to the wind turbine due to the way it harnesses more wind.

The turbulence created as a result of the new configuration creates a low pressure zone behind the turbine, causing greater wind to pass through the turbine, and this, in turn, increases blade rotation and energy output. One way to get the most out of the wind input is by using a specially shaped tube around the blades. The tube, or shroud, is shaped as a diffuser which works like a magnifying glass for wind. The diffuser, which is smaller in the front and bigger in the back, catches more wind and focuses the wind towards the center blades which also leads to more efficient production of power.

In addition to the diffuser shape of the shroud, the back has a brim. This brim disturbs the wind flow which creates vortexes that cause a low pressure area to be formed behind the wind lens. The wind then flows to the low pressure area through the blades of the wind lens. The increased airflow through the blades leads to another reason of higher power production.

The diffuser shape and the brim combined creates more efficiently placed and accurate airflow. This results in a higher amount of energy that is produced.

Impacts 
Complaints about the wind turbine include the effect on the bird population, sound production, and radar interference which limits all its placement in urban areas. The creators of the wind lens took a look at the problems and tried to solve them by adjusting the design.

Bird population 
Wind turbines have a detrimental effect on the bird population due to migration patterns and birds being caught and injured or even killed by the towering high speed blade. In order to fix this issue, the wind lens shroud that is around the blade, helps protect birds from entering the path of the blade and a mesh has been added to either end to prevent birds from being pulled into its blades. The addition of this mesh creates a negligible decrease in power production therefore having more benefits. In addition to the mesh, the wind lens is designed to avoid birds by making it a more compact and shorter, therefore making it possible for birds to easily fly over the wind lens unlike the wind turbine.

Sound production 
Wind lenses have been made such that it produces less sound than wind turbines, making it possible for placement in urban areas without disturbing residents. The design of the blade is made so the angle and shape of the blade is able to cut through the wind more silently.

The biggest cause of the sound in the conventional wind turbine is the air drag at the tips of the blades but now the tips of the blades are covered and the more of the wind is more focused towards the center of the blades due to the diffuser shroud which means the air drag at the tips of the blades are minimized.

Radar interference 
Radar interference is consistently a problem with wind turbines which causes different groups to be against the use of wind farms near urban areas. After studies were performed to test the radar interference of wind lenses compared to the wind turbine, the wind lens had significantly less interference because of the smaller more compact design of the shroud itself as well as the shape and make of the shroud making it less of a problem with radar interference.

Limitations 
Despite the beneficial additions to the design, there are still limitations.

The wind lens requires far more materials compared to the current design of wind turbines. Such materials for the shroud as well as the mesh requires a great amount of energy and cost.

While still producing less noise and interference, it will still cause disturbances until it becomes zero.

The wind load on the wind lens is higher and therefore may be too heavy for the wind lens to maintain due to structural challenges. This means it may have a lot of power unused or that the wind lens is more prone to breaking.

The idea is not anything new and previous testing has tried and failed, however other projects have never had large scale testing and have come to a stage this far with this much success.

Application 
The wind lens is being looked to as a way to increase the production of clean energy as well as an archetype for other types of clean energy.

The wind lens can replace the current production energy of fossil fuels which harms the environment and can be an alternative to the less efficient wind turbine since it is adaptable to more environments and produces higher amounts of energy.

Current projects 
The wind lens is currently being adjusted and approved by testing it in multiple ways and at multiple places.
 Having been extensively researched at the University of Kettering, the wind lens is being extensively tested and has been concluded to be a positive while in use in Michigan.
 In Japan, the wind lens is being implemented in urban areas by the shore where windspeeds are high
 The wind lens is being tested at an offshore site where it was a floating multipurpose body that combines solar panels, fish farms, and the wind lens to use it for power harvesting, fish farming, and transportation of resources
 The wind lens is being adapted to also be used under water as a water lens in order to harvest the power available from water currents.
 The wind lens is being adjusted at the University of Kyushu Ito campus to make it more structurally sound and able to bear the load of the increased amount of wind

See also 

 Compact wind acceleration turbine
 Darrieus wind turbine
 Éolienne Bollée
 Giromill
 Savonius wind turbine
 Wind turbine
 Windbelt
 Windpump

References

External links 

 Wind Lens Triples Turbine Output  https://cleantechnica.com/2011/09/02/wind-lens-triples-turbine-output/
 Wind Engineering Research Kyushu University  http://www.riam.kyushu-u.ac.jp/windeng/en_aboutus_detail04.html
 Highly Efficient Wind and Water Turbines With Wind-Lens Technology & Offshore Floating Renewable Energy https://www.riam.kyushu-u.ac.jp/windeng/img/aboutus_detail_image/Wind_Lens_20140601.pdf
 Is the ‘Wind Lens’ a Green Energy Breakthrough? http://learn.eartheasy.com/2012/03/is-the-wind-lens-a-green-energy-breakthrough/
 The radar signature of the Wind Lens: A less disruptive wind turbine? https://ieeexplore.ieee.org/abstract/document/6494839
 Introduction to wind concentrators  http://wind-energy.ucoz.com/
 Japanese breakthrough will make wind power cheaper than nuclear http://www.mnn.com/green-tech/research-innovations/blogs/japanese-breakthrough-will-make-wind-power-cheaper-than
 A Shrouded Wind Turbine Generating High Output Power with Wind-lens Technology http://www.mdpi.com/1996-1073/3/4/634/htm
 BBC https://www.bbc.com/news/business-31300982
 Next Generation Wind Turbine http://windlens.com/wp-content/uploads/2012/05/windlens20120515EN.pdf
 Events on Kyushu University Wind Lens Project- Phase 1 http://www.4coffshore.com/windfarms/project-dates-for-kyushu-university-wind-lens-project---phase-1-jp12.html
 Events on Kyushu University Wind Lens Project- Phase 2 http://www.4coffshore.com/windfarms/project-dates-for-kyushu-university-wind-lens-project---phase-2-jp08.html
 Kettering University researchers explore optimizing wind turbines with new propeller design https://news.kettering.edu/news/kettering-university-researchers-explore-optimizing-wind-turbines-new-propeller-design
 http://www.eco-tube.com/v/ENERGY/New_Wind_Power_cheaper_than_nuclear.aspx Video about how the wind lens concept works 

Wind turbines
Sustainable energy
Wind power